Riley Reid (born July 9, 1991) is an American pornographic actress. She has won over 45 awards, including the 2014 XBIZ Award for Female Performer of the Year and the AVN Award for Female Performer of the Year in 2016.

Career
Reid briefly worked as a stripper before entering the adult film industry in 2010, at the age of 19, and initially used the stage name Paige Riley. In 2013, LA Weekly ranked her eighth on their list of "10 Porn Stars Who Could Be the Next Jenna Jameson". She was also placed on CNBC's list of "The Dirty Dozen: Porn's Most Popular Stars" in 2014, 2015, and 2016.

Reid won the XBIZ Awards for Best New Starlet in 2013 and Female Performer of the Year in 2014, making her the first performer to ever win the awards consecutively. She was inducted into the XRCO Hall of Fame in 2021.

Awards

References

External links

 
 
 
 

American female erotic dancers
American erotic dancers
American pornographic film actresses
Florida International University alumni
Living people
People from Miami Beach, Florida
Pornographic film actors from Florida
21st-century American women
1991 births